The 2018 Women's Six Nations Championship, also known as the 2018 RBS Women's Six Nations sponsored by Royal Bank of Scotland, was the 17th series of the Women's Six Nations Championship, an annual women's rugby union competition between six European rugby union national teams. Matches were held in February and March 2018, on the same weekends as the men's tournament, if not always the same day.

As in the 2017 tournament, the 2018 tournament used the rugby union bonus points system common to other professional tournaments: "As well as the standard four points for a win or two for a draw, a team scoring four or more tries during a match will receive an additional league table point, as will a team losing by 7 or fewer points". "Additionally, to ensure that a team winning all of its five matches (a Grand Slam) will also win the Championship, three bonus points will be awarded for this achievement".

Table

Fixtures

Week 1

Week 2

Week 3

Week 4

Week 5

References

External links
The official RBS Six Nations Site

2018
2018 rugby union tournaments for national teams
2017–18 in Irish rugby union
2017–18 in English rugby union
2017–18 in Welsh rugby union
2017–18 in Scottish rugby union
2017–18 in French rugby union
2017–18 in Italian rugby union
Six
rugby union
rugby union
rugby union
rugby union
rugby union
Women
rugby union
Women's Six Nations
Women's Six Nations